Pukekohe is a town in the Auckland Region of the North Island of New Zealand. Located at the southern edge of the Auckland Region, it is in South Auckland, between the southern shore of the Manukau Harbour and the mouth of the Waikato River. The hills of Pukekohe and nearby Bombay Hills form the natural southern limit of the Auckland region. Pukekohe is located within the political boundaries of the Auckland Council, following the abolition of the Franklin District Council on 1 November 2010.

With a population of  Pukekohe is the 24th largest urban area in New Zealand, and the third largest in the Auckland Region behind Auckland itself and Hibiscus Coast.

Pukekohe is a rural service town for the area formerly known as the Franklin District. Its population is mainly of European descent, with significant Māori and ethnic Indian and East Asian communities. There are also a notable number of people of South African and Dutch descent. The fertile volcanic soil and warm moist climate supports a large horticultural and dairy farming industry; the Pukekohe long keeper onion is well known internationally.

Geology 

Pukekohe and the surrounding areas are a section of the South Auckland volcanic field, which erupted between 550,000 and 1,600,000 years ago.

History and culture

Māori history

The Māori word puke-kohe means "hill of the kohekohe", New Zealand's native mahogany.

During the period of the Musket Wars of 1807-1843, Northern iwi (tribes) attacked parts of the Auckland area, including Pukekohe. From the 1820s, as a result of these attacks, the resident Māori population who survived, mainly migrated south.

The two main iwi of the area are Ngati Tamaoho and Ngati Te Ata. Waikato-Tainui has a strong presence.

European settlement
When European settlers arrived, the remnant Māori population initially provided them with food supplies. As the number of settlers grew, the Pukekohe area, which was largely bush covered, was opened up after 1843 and individual farmers purchased small blocks of land which they cleared by hand.

By 1863, the land was still bush covered but with an increasing number of small isolated farms. When Kīngitanga Māori refused to swear an oath of allegiance to the Crown, many Māori moved out of the area, but some remained. A Māori from this area guided the first gunboats through the Waikato Heads and through the shoals of the Waikato River delta to help put down the rebel Kīngitanga uprising.

New Zealand Wars

A major battle of the 1863 New Zealand Wars was fought at Pukekohe East between 11 armed Pākehā settlers, who were converting the Pukekohe East church into a redoubt and approximately 200–300 Māori, mainly from the Waikato area. Although surprised and severely outnumbered, the settlers held off the Kīngitanga invaders until troops arrived. No settlers were killed or injured while 30 Māori were killed with an unknown number wounded. 6 bodies were found near the church and 24 were later found buried in the bush. The church still exists today and the bullet holes are still visible.

Although there were many other attacks on settlers in Auckland the Māori preferred isolated targets. As most women and children had been evacuated to Auckland city most of those killed were men and teenage boys. Māori were able to hide in the pockets of bush and live off the settlers' goods and livestock. Nearly the entire Pukekohe area was abandoned apart from military outposts. Isolated attacks occurred as late as November 1863 after the Battle of Rangiriri.

Marae

Ngā Hau e Whā Marae is located in the Pukekohe area. It is the tribal meeting grounds of Ngāti Tamaoho and the Waikato Tainui hapū of Ngāi Tai and Ngāti Tamaoho.

Demographics

Pukekohe had a population of 23,904 at the 2018 New Zealand census, an increase of 3,378 people (16.5%) since the 2013 census, and an increase of 6,636 people (38.4%) since the 2006 census. There were 8,031 households, comprising 11,532 males and 12,366 females, giving a sex ratio of 0.93 males per female, with 5,391 people (22.6%) aged under 15 years, 4,605 (19.3%) aged 15 to 29, 9,951 (41.6%) aged 30 to 64, and 3,960 (16.6%) aged 65 or older.

Ethnicities were 70.9% European/Pākehā, 19.8% Māori, 9.0% Pacific peoples, 12.2% Asian, and 2.2% other ethnicities. People may identify with more than one ethnicity.

The percentage of people born overseas was 24.3, compared with 27.1% nationally.

Although some people chose not to answer the census's question about religious affiliation, 46.3% had no religion, 38.0% were Christian, 1.6% had Māori religious beliefs, 3.0% were Hindu, 1.0% were Muslim, 0.5% were Buddhist and 3.0% had other religions.

Of those at least 15 years old, 2,973 (16.1%) people had a bachelor's or higher degree, and 3,876 (20.9%) people had no formal qualifications. 3,411 people (18.4%) earned over $70,000 compared to 17.2% nationally. The employment status of those at least 15 was that 9,291 (50.2%) people were employed full-time, 2,439 (13.2%) were part-time, and 792 (4.3%) were unemployed.

Local government 

Pukekohe had a local government just like other suburbs of Auckland at that time. The local government was called Pukekohe Borough Council, which started in 1912 and merged into Franklin District Council in 1989, eventually being amalgamated into Auckland Council in November 2010.

The mayors of Pukekohe Borough Council were:
1912–1912 William Dunn
1912–1915 C. K. Lawrie
1915–1919 Henry Greathead Rex Mason
1919–1921 C. K. Lawrie
1921–1935 John Routly
1935–1938 C. K. Lawrie
1938–1941 John Routly
1941–1950 Maxwell Rae Grierson
1950–1963 S. C. Childs
1963–1974 C. W. J. Lawrie
1974–1989 Max R. Short

Since 2010, the Franklin Local Board represents local government in the area.  The local board is one of 21 local boards across Auckland. The current Councillor is Bill Cashmore who is also the Deputy Mayor. Local MP is Andrew Bayley, National Party.

Education 
The school opened in 1921 as Pukekohe Technical High School, and was renamed to Pukekohe High School in 1948.

The school opened in 1966

Pukekohe East School opened in 1880. Pukekohe Maori School opened in 1952 and was renamed to Pukekohe Hill School in 1966. Valley School opened in 1966.

The school opened in 1957, although the official opening was in 1958.

KingsGate is an interdenominational Christian school. It opened in 1996. St Joseph's is a Catholic school which opened in 1923.

It provides education for students with special needs up to the age of 21.

Tamaoho School is a contributing primary school which opened in 2021.

All these schools are coeducational. Rolls are as of 

A significant number of kids leave the area by school bus to attend Kings College, Sacred Heart College, St Kentigern’s, Hamilton Boys HS, Baradene, Hauraki Plains College, St Peter’s Collegiate and Strathallan College.

Sports

Pukekohe Park Raceway is a motorsports and horse-racing facility. Opened in 1963, this circuit is famous for having hosted the New Zealand Grand Prix 29 times between 1963 and 2000, as well as the V8 International (a round of the V8 Supercars championship) between 2001 and 2007. The V8 Supercars event was moved to Hamilton for five years, but returned to Pukekohe in 2013.

Pukekohe RFC represent the town in rugby union. The Counties Manukau Rugby Football Union are based in Pukekohe and play home matches at Navigation Homes Stadium.

Pukekohe is home to Pukekohe AFC who are members of the Northern Region Football. Bledisloe Park Sports Centre (overlooking Bledisloe Park grounds) is home to both Pukekohe AFC and Pukekohe Metro Cricket Club. The sports centre is managed by the Bledisloe Park Society Committee.

Auckland Metropolitan Clay Target Club, is a clay target shooting club located just outside Pukekohe, offering recreational and competitive target shooting.

Puni Mountain Bike Track, located at Puni Memorial Park, has roughly 6–7 km of single-track. Sunset Coast BMX and Puni Rugby Club are also located at Puni Memorial Park.

The town has a golf club and a tennis club.

Media 

Franklin County News is the local newspaper distributed twice weekly to homes in Pukekohe and surrounding towns, including Waiuku and Tuakau.

The Post Newspaper issues almost 22,000 copies weekly on a Tuesday within Franklin and Tuakau and is based in Waiuku.

In 2015, the online events calendar and photo news Franklin Life NZ was launched.

In 2013, the film Mt. Zion was released in New Zealand, portraying Māori life in 1970s Pukekohe.

Transport 

Pukekohe railway station is on the North Island Main Trunk Railway and is the southernmost station of the Auckland rail network, at the end of the Southern Line. The portion of the line between Papakura and Pukekohe is currently closed for electrification until 2024 after which electric trains will run directly to Pukekohe from the Auckland CBD. A rail replacement bus is currently running between Papakura and Pukekohe while the line is closed. In July 2017, it was announced that the purchase of battery-powered electric trains had been "agreed in principle" by Auckland Council and that an all-electric service would be operational in 2019 (provisionally, subject to conditions), four years after completion of the rest of the region's electrified rail network. However, the purchase of battery-powered trains did not proceed. In 2020, the government announced funding to extend electrification from Papakura to Pukekohe.

There are several loop bus services serving central Pukekohe and also connecting to the western and southern townships of Patumahoe, Waiuku, Tuakau and Port Waikato. There are no bus services north of the town (beyond Paerata) and none at all serving travel to the east.

Notable people 

Bill Birch, MP—was a long-time resident
Peter (Possum) Bourne, Rally driver
Leslie Comrie, astronomer and pioneer in mechanical computation
Andy Dalton, resident and All Blacks captain
Simon Doull, cricket representative and radio personality
Peter Fa'afiu, diplomat, global director of Amnesty International
A. J. Hackett, entrepreneur who popularised bungee jumping
Madonna Harris, resident and sportswoman
Liam Lawson, F2 Racing Driver raised in Pukekohe
Jonah Lomu, All Black, born in Pukekohe, educated at Wesley College
Rex Mason, mayor and MP
Mick Peck, award-winning magician and entertainer
Malietoa Tanumafili II, Samoan Head of State—educated at Wesley College
Allan Wilson, molecular biologist—grew up in the area

References

External links 
Pukekohe - the heart of Franklin

Populated places in the Auckland Region